Mikel Lasa Goikoetxea (born 9 September 1971) is a Spanish football retired player and current manager. He played as a left back. He currently manages Futuro Kings FC in Equatorial Guinea.

He played 267 La Liga matches over 13 seasons (six goals scored), representing Real Sociedad, Real Madrid and Athletic Bilbao.

Lasa was part of the squad that won the Olympic gold medal in 1992.

Club career
Lasa was born in Legorreta, Gipuzkoa. He was a product of local Real Sociedad's youth academy, and made his La Liga debut not yet aged 18, as the Basque side was coached by John Toshack, during the 1988–89 season.

After delivering as a young talent, Lasa signed with Real Madrid for the 1991–92 campaign for approximately €1.7 million, seen as a replacement for ageing Rafael Gordillo. After struggling initially, barred by Francisco Villarroya, he eventually became the starter, also scoring in the club's 2–0 win in the 1993 Copa del Rey final against Real Zaragoza;  however, he would be virtually absent from the lineups after the 1996 signing of Brazilian Roberto Carlos.

Lasa joined Real Sociedad's neighbours, Athletic Bilbao, in 1997–98, being an important first-team element as they achieved a runner-up place. He played very little in his final three seasons and retired altogether in 2004, after Segunda División spells with neighbours Real and Ciudad de Murcia.

International career
Lasa played twice for Spain in 1993, incidentally both matches being against Lithuania during the 1994 FIFA World Cup qualifiers. He was also a member of the side that won the gold medal at the 1992 Summer Olympics, in Barcelona.

Honours

Club
Real Madrid
La Liga: 1994–95, 1996–97
Copa del Rey: 1992–93
Supercopa de España: 1993

Murcia
Segunda División: 2002–03

International
Spain U16
UEFA European Under-16 Championship: 1988

Spain U23
Summer Olympic Games: 1992

Spain U21
UEFA European Under-21 Championship: Third-place 1994

References

External links
 
 
 
 
 

1971 births
Living people
People from Goierri
Spanish footballers
Footballers from the Basque Country (autonomous community)
Association football defenders
La Liga players
Segunda División players
Segunda División B players
Real Sociedad B footballers
Real Sociedad footballers
Real Madrid CF players
Athletic Bilbao footballers
Real Murcia players
Ciudad de Murcia footballers
Spain youth international footballers
Spain under-21 international footballers
Spain under-23 international footballers
Spain international footballers
Footballers at the 1992 Summer Olympics
Olympic footballers of Spain
Olympic gold medalists for Spain
Olympic medalists in football
Medalists at the 1992 Summer Olympics
Basque Country international footballers
Spanish football managers
Futuro Kings FC managers
Spanish expatriate football managers
Spanish expatriate sportspeople in Equatorial Guinea
Expatriate football managers in Equatorial Guinea
Sportspeople from Gipuzkoa